The Miss Michigan competition is the pageant that selects the representative for the state of Michigan in the Miss America pageant. Michigan has won the Miss America crown on five occasions.

Melissa Beyrand of Milford was crowned Miss Michigan 2022 on June 18, 2022 at Frauenthal Theatre in Muskegon. She competed for the title of Miss America 2023 at the Mohegan Sun in Uncasville, Connecticut in December 2022.

Gallery of past titleholders

Results summary 
The following is a visual summary of the past results of Miss Michigan titleholders at the national Miss America pageants/competitions. The year in parentheses indicates the year of the national competition during which a placement and/or award was garnered, not the year attached to the contestant's state title.

Placements
 Miss Americas: Patricia Donnelly (1939), Nancy Fleming (1961), Pamela Eldred (1970), Kaye Lani Rae Rafko (1988), Kirsten Haglund (2008)
 2nd runners-up: Monnie Drake (1940), Patricia Hill (1942)
 3rd runners-up: Kelly Lynn Garver (1987)
 4th runners-up: Janice Hutton Somers (1955)
 Top 10: Carole Van Valin (1963), Alecia Rae Masalkoski (1986), Che'vonne Burton (2001), Stacy Essebaggers (2002), Madonna Kimberly Emond (2004), Ashlee Baracy (2009)
 Top 12: Beverly Bennett (1944)
 Top 15: Jane Porter* (1925), Joyce Jean Hurd** (1926), Charlotte Jane Lowe*** (1927), Gerry Marcoux (1941), Doris Evelyn Johnson (1948), Dolores Jane Motter (1949)
 Top 18: Barbara Strand (1933)

Michigan holds a record of 23 placements at Miss America.

Awards

Preliminary awards
 Preliminary Lifestyle and Fitness: Nancy Fleming (1961), Carole Van Valin (1963), Kaye Lani Rae Rafko (1988), Kirsten Haglund (2008)
 Preliminary Talent: Monnie Drake (1940) (tie), Janice Hutton Somers (1955) (tie), Ann Penelope Marston (1960), Nancy Fleming (1961) (tie),  Kelly Lynn Garver (1987), Nicole Blaszczyk (2010), Arianna Quan (2017)

Non-finalist awards
 Non-finalist Talent: Shirley Swanson (1957), Sarah Jane Noble (1965), Esther Lynne Smith (1966), Toni Jo Abbenante (1968), Linda Susan Kish (1972), Terri Cousino (1973), Bethany Wright (1980), Barbara Jean Crandall (1985), Sandra Kay Metiva (1992), Maria Malay Kamara (1995), Nicole Blaszczyk (2010), Arianna Quan (2017), Vivian Zhong (2021).

Other awards
 Miss Congeniality: Katie Lynn LaRoche (2011)
 Equity & Justice Scholarship Award Finalists: Mallory Rivard (2020)
 Evening Dress Award Second Prize: M. Beth Madson* (1922)
 Louanne Gamba Special Instrumentalist Award: Arianna Quan (2017)
 Miss America Scholar Award: Ashlee Baracy (2009)
 Private Interview Award: Mallory Rivard (2020)
 Quality of Life Award Winners:  Katie Lynn LaRoche (2011), Haley Williams (2014)
 Quality of Life Award 1st runners-up: Stacey Gail Heisler (1994), Ashlee Baracy (2009)
 Quality of Life Award 2nd runners-up: Terri Sue Liford (1993), Elizabeth Wertenberger (2012)
STEM Scholarship Winner: Vivian Zhong (2022)

Winners

References

External links
 Miss Michigan official website

Michigan culture
Michigan
Women in Michigan
Annual events in Michigan